Steel Meets Steel: Ten Years of Glory is the first compilation album by Swedish power metal group HammerFall, released on 23 October 2007.

The album consists of two discs compiling (and remastering) some of the band's most popular works from 1997 to 2006, as well as three new songs ("The Abyss", "Last Man Standing", and "Restless Soul").

It is one of the few albums where the band mascot, the knight Hector, does not appear.

The song "Last Man Standing" was also released as a single but it was only sold online as an .mp3-file. The song was also made into a music video.

Track listing 
Listing:

Additional information
Tracks 13 and 14 on the second disc are live versions recorded in Göteborg's Musikens Hus during 1998.

Credits
 Joacim Cans – lead vocals
 Oscar Dronjak – guitars, backing vocals
 Stefan Elmgren – guitars, backing vocals (disc 1 tracks 1-3, 7-15; disc 2 all tracks)
 Fredrik Larsson – bass, backing vocals (disc 1 tracks 1-6; disc 2 tracks 12)
 Anders Johansson – drums (disc 1 tracks 1-3, 10-15; disc 2 all tracks)
 Glenn Ljungström – guitars (disc 1 tracks 4-6)
 Patrik Räfling – drums (disc 1 tracks 4-10; Disc 2 tracks 13-14)
 Magnus Rosén – bass (disc 1 tracks 7-15; Disc 2 tracks 1-11, 13-14)

References

2007 compilation albums
HammerFall albums
Nuclear Blast compilation albums